The 2004 Dimapur bombings, were a series of two coordinated attacks carried out by Islamist terrorists on the morning of Saturday, 2 October 2004 in Dimapur that targeted passengers at the Dimapur Railway Station and shoppers at the Hong Kong Market during the morning rush hour. The attack killed 30 people and about 100 others were injured.

The attacks occurred simultaneously  at around 9:30 a.m. The attacks occurred—one at the Dimapur Railway Station, significantly damaging the platform at its surroundings and the other at the Hong Kong Market. To date, it was the deadliest terrorist attack in Nagaland.

Attacks 
At 9:30 a.m. on 2 October 2004, two bombs were detonated almost simultaneously at the Dimapur Railway Station and the Hong Kong Market.

The bomb at the station was reportedly planted in the station manager's room. The blast was so powerful that the entire platform of the station was blowned off.

In the aftermath all the trains enroute between Guwahati and Dibrugarh passing through Dimapur were suspended.

Victims 
Officials reported that 15 were killed at the Railway Station, 10 at the Hong Kong Market and 5 others succumbed to their injuries at the Dimapur Civil Hospital.

Investigation

Perpetrators 
10 suspects were apprehended by the Special Investigation Team (SIT) probing the attacks. They were Abdul Kalam, Babul Hussain, Haizul Ali, Hukum Ali, Kudus Ali, Nazimuddin, Nurjamal, Panas Ali, Sahib Uddin and Shajan Ali.

Of the ten, one Nazimuddin committed suicide at police custody in 2010 and the other Hukum Ali, according to a report filed by the SIT, was the leader of the group that planted the bomb at the railway station, passed away in April 2014 of natural causes.

See also 
 1996 Dimapur car bombing
 List of terrorist incidents
 Timeline of Naga history

References 

 
Terrorist incidents in India in 2004
Attacks on railway stations
Attacks in Asia in 2004
Islamic terrorist incidents in 2004
Mass murder in 2004
October 2004 crimes
October 2004 events in Asia